Tatango is an U.S. mobile marketing company that specializes in text message marketing (SMS/MMS) services.

Tatango's software enables clients to build campaigns and engage consumers through text message promotions and alerts and this is open to users in the U.S. and Canada. Tatango is a privately held corporation based in Seattle, WA, with investments from the Seattle Alliance of Angels.

History
Derek Johnson, the founder, founded the service originally named NetworkText when at the University of Houston's Bauer College of Business.  Initially started as a solution for his fraternity (Delta Upsilon) to communicate with his fraternity brothers.

Tatango was originally designed to allow groups and organizations to use the service to send text messages to their members, while NetworkText inserted 30-40 character text ads at the bottom of each text message. The service was free for groups and organizations in collaboration with 4INFO. This was later reviewed on July 26, 2008 and the company started charging a monthly fee to use the service.

Johnson left college and moved to Bellingham, WA, where he founded NetworkText with Matt Pelo, who left the company later that year. In 2008, the company was renamed to Tatango, and offices were found. Tatango moved from being a Limited-liability company to a Corporation late in 2008. In October that same year, Tatango launched a voice messaging service, which has since been discontinued.

Tatango acquired HungryThumb in 2012 and Broadtexter the following year. In 2016 Tatango launched the U.S. Short Code Directory.

In 2022, Kevin Fitzgerald became the CEO, and Derek Johnson became Chief Innovation Officer.

Highlights
 In 2009 Tantago's CEO makes Top entrepreneur's list in Business Week's 2009 Best Young Entrepreneurs list

 Also Mention in Forbes as the Killer app of the 2012 election

Press
Tatango has been featured on TechCrunch, Cnet 
The Seattle Times  and LifeHacker.

Tatango CEO, Derek Johnson has also been featured in The Wall Street Journal in the article.

References

External links
 

Mobile telecommunication services